Drew Friedman may refer to:

 Drew "Dru-Ha" Friedman, music executive
 Drew Friedman (cartoonist) (born 1958), American cartoonist and illustrator

See also 
 Andrew Friedman (disambiguation)